The Division of Lyons is an Australian electoral division in Tasmania.

Geography
Since 1984, federal electoral division boundaries in Australia have been determined at redistributions by a redistribution committee appointed by the Australian Electoral Commission. Redistributions occur for the boundaries of divisions in a particular state, and they occur every seven years, or sooner if a state's representation entitlement changes or when divisions of a state are malapportioned.

History

The division was created at the Federal redistribution of 12 September 1984 as a reconfigured version of the abolished Division of Wilmot.  The name jointly honours Joseph Lyons, Prime Minister of Australia 1932–39, Member for Wilmot from 1929–39, and his wife Dame Enid Lyons, the first woman elected to the Australian House of Representatives (1943) and subsequently the first female member of Cabinet (1949–51).  Joseph Lyons had previously represented Wilmot at the state level from 1909 to 1929.

It has been a marginal seat, changing hands between the Australian Labor Party and the Liberal Party. It is located in central Tasmania, stretching from the eastern to northern coast and includes such places as New Norfolk, Deloraine and St Marys, as well as the outer northern suburbs of Hobart.

Members

Election results

References

External links
 Division of Lyons – Australian Electoral Commission
 2016 Census QuickStats, Federal Division of Lyons

Electoral divisions of Australia
Constituencies established in 1984
1984 establishments in Australia
Lyons (federal)
Lyons (federal)
Lyons (federal)